The Scarisbrick Baronetcy, of Greaves Hall in the Parish of North Meols in the County Palatine of Lancaster, was a title in the Baronetage of the United Kingdom. It was created on 17 July 1909 for the Liberal politician Thomas Scarisbrick. He was the son of Sir Charles Scarisbrick, Mayor of Southport. The title became extinct on the death of the second Baronet in 1955.

The family seat was Scarisbrick Hall, Scarisbrick, Lancashire.

Scarisbrick baronets, of Greaves Hall (1909)
Sir Thomas Talbot Leyland Scarisbrick, 1st Baronet (1874–1933)
Sir Everard Talbot Scarisbrick, 2nd Baronet (1896–1955)

Arms

References

Extinct baronetcies in the Baronetage of the United Kingdom